The James Beard Foundation is a New York City–based national non-profit culinary arts organization named in honor of James Beard, a prolific food writer, teacher, and cookbook author, who was also known as the "Dean of American Cookery." The programs run the gamut from elegant guest-chef dinners to scholarships for aspiring culinary students, educational conferences, and industry awards. In the spirit of James Beard's legacy, the foundation not only creates programs that help educate people about American cuisine, but also support and promote the chefs and other industry professionals who are behind it.

History 

The foundation was started in 1986 by Peter Kump, a former student of James Beard who also founded the Institute of Culinary Education. At Julia Child's suggestion, Kump purchased Beard's New York brownstone townhouse at 167 West 12th Street in Greenwich Village and preserved it as a gathering place where the general public and press alike would be able to appreciate the talents of established and emerging chefs. The first such dinner was at the suggestion of Wolfgang Puck in 1987. Puck cooked a dinner to raise money and Kump later established it as a monthly event.

Leonard F. Pickell Jr. was nominated as president of the foundation in 1995. In August 2004, shortly before the results of a three-month audit were to be announced, he resigned. He was charged with fraud in late September, having misused the foundation's finances for unnecessary and undocumented expenses. Pickell later pleaded guilty to second-degree grand larceny and a $1.1 million theft. As a result of the scandal and his indictment by the Attorney General's Office, the members of the board of the foundation were asked to resign in January 2005.

In January 2006, the reconstituted board, under the direction of interim president Edna Morris, initiated a search for a permanent president of the foundation. In April that year Susan Ungaro, formerly editor-in-chief of Family Circle magazine from 1976 to 2005, was appointed president. Following the scandal, the foundation also made changes such as creating a salary for the president, CFO, auditors and a larger staff. The foundation lost about $1 million under Pickell's leadership, and paid approximately $750,000 in legal and accounting fees. Sponsorships, donations, and event revenues also dropped after the scandal broke prompting the foundation to take out a $2 million mortgage on the Beard home, the only asset.

In October 2007, the board announced that Woodrow W. Campbell, senior partner at Debevoise & Plimpton, would be taking over chairmanship of the board after the resignation of Dorothy Cann Hamilton who served since 2005. Emily Luchetti, two-time James Beard Award-winning executive pastry chef and multiple cookbook author, was named chair of the foundation's board of trustees in May 2012, succeeding Woodrow W. Campbell. In 2012, the foundation also announced the following appointments: Michael Phillips, chief operating officer, Jamestown Properties, and Frederic M. Seegal, vice chairman, Peter J. Solomon Company, as the board's new vice chairs; Erica Gruen, a principal with Quantum Media Consulting, remained secretary.

During her presidency, Susan Ungaro increased the organization's income, tripling it to roughly $12 million, with a $400,000 surplus. She also expanded the foundation's culinary scholarship program; increased its membership base with a new online enrollment program; moved the annual James Beard Foundation Awards Gala to Lincoln Center and then Chicago; and hosted the James Beard Foundation's traveling national food festival. In September 2012, Susan Ungaro collaborated with the U.S. Department of State to develop the “Diplomatic Culinary Partnership,” an initiative to elevate the role of culinary engagement in America's formal and public diplomacy efforts. During Ungaro's tenure, the foundation created the James Beard Foundation Food Conference.

In 2018, Clare Reichenbach was unanimously selected by the board as the foundation's new chief executive, replacing Susan Ungaro. Reichenbach's background is in marketing and consulting, rather than food.

Programs

Dinners 
Each year, the James Beard House hosts over 200 dinners featuring selected acclaimed chefs who prepare tasting menus in the Beard House kitchen, which diners can pass through and observe. Notable past chefs have included Daniel Boulud, Emeril Lagasse, Nobu Matsuhisa, Jacques Pépin, Marcus Samuelsson, and Charlie Trotter. These events are open to the public, with dining discounts for Foundation members.

Greens 
James Beard Foundation Greens events are for New York City food lovers under 40 to experience various culinary experiences and network. Most events take place outside the foundation's West Village townhouse and various locations around the city. Founded during Susan Ungaro's tenure as president of the foundation, the organization hopes to continue attracting younger audiences through these events.

Awards 

The "Oscars of the food world" are held annually to honor exceptional chefs and journalists. The premier Awards gala is held on the first Monday in May and features a ceremony and a chef's tasting reception. The foundation's awards for journalism, books, and other media are held on a separate day. In 2014, the board elected to move the Restaurant and Chef Awards from Lincoln Center in New York to Chicago after Chicago appealed to the foundation to move the event.

The volunteer committee that presides over the awards distribution issued a criticism of the organization after being asked to conduct a recount of the 2020 voting when no black awardees were selected for the 23 categories. The 2020 awards were delayed by the coronavirus pandemic and ultimately the foundation decided to not announce any winners and cancel the 2021 awards. According to the committee, these cancellations were a result of the controversy and several attempts by the foundation to alter the established awards procedures.

Scholarships 
In 1991, the James Beard Foundation began offering scholarships for students entering a variety of fields, including culinary studies, pastry and baking, hotel and restaurant management, wine studies, nutrition, and food writing. As of 2018, the program has awarded 2,000 recipients over $8 million in financial aid.

Other initiatives 
The foundation has also created leadership initiatives, including the Women's Leadership Program, Chefs Boot Camp for Policy and Change, and the Leadership Awards.

Publications
Bimonthly JBF Events — What's going on at the James Beard House in NYC and at events around the country
Bimonthly JBF Notes — A members-only newsletter about trends in the food world, recipes, and more
Biweekly Beard Bites — A digital newsletter with information about upcoming events and Foundation news.
Monthly Previews — A monthly digital publication that gives three months’ advance notice of events. It is available as a benefit to high-level members, beginning at the Fellowship level.
Delights and Prejudices — The official JBF blog, featuring Foundation news, recipes, and original content.
The Good Food Org Guide — A comprehensive directory of nonprofit organizations that are working toward a better food system published in partnership with Food Tank.

References

External links
 

Non-profit organizations based in New York City
Organizations established in 1986
Arts organizations based in New York City
Culinary professional associations
1986 establishments in New York City